Kharkush also Khaṟkus ( is a mountain of the Hindu Kush in Afghanistan. It is located in Ghazni Province.

Kharkush (Ghaznī) is about 230 km South-West of Kabul, the capital of Afghanistan.

References 

Mountains of Afghanistan
Four-thousanders of the Hindu Kush
Landforms of Ghazni Province